Ken Karpoff (born 14 January 1956) is a Canadian former biathlete who competed in the 1988 Winter Olympics.

References

1956 births
Living people
Canadian male biathletes
Olympic biathletes of Canada
Biathletes at the 1988 Winter Olympics